James Henderson (born 6 August 1975) is a South African former cricketer. He played in 64 first-class and 42 List A matches from 1994 to 2005.

See also
 List of Boland representative cricketers

References

External links
 

1975 births
Living people
South African cricketers
Boland cricketers
Gauteng cricketers
North West cricketers
Free State cricketers
Knights cricketers
People from Worcester, South Africa
Cricketers from the Western Cape